Hamster may refer to 

Hamster, a rodent 
Golden hamster, a rodent native to Syria and Anatolia 
European hamster, a rodent native to Eurasia 
Chinese hamster, a rodent native to China and Mongolia 
Mongolian hamster, a rodent native to Mongolia and China 
Romanian hamster, a rodent native to Bulgaria and Romania 
Dwarf hamster (disambiguation), a small rodent, one of several species

Entertainment
The Hamsters, a British band 
Hamster Jam, a CD by the Hamsters
The Hamsters (album), a CD by the Hamsters
The Hamster, a name used by Richard Hammond (born 1969), an English television presenter 
Hamster Corporation, a video game publisher
Hamster Theatre, an American musical group 
Bounty Hamster, a British science fiction cartoon series 
The Hamster Cage, a Canadian feature film of 2005
The Hamster Wheel, an Australian television series 
Hamster Monogatari 64, a Nintendo game
Hamsterz Life, a Nintendo game

Other
Hamster wheel, a rotating exercise machine 
The Hamster Dance, an alternative name for Hampster Dance, an internet meme